Chaetacanthus may refer to:
 Chaetacanthus (polychaete), a genus of polychaetes in the family Polynoidae
 Chaetacanthus, a genus of plants in the family Acanthaceae, synonym of Dyschoriste